Ralph Carroll Jones (February 14, 1922 – February 18, 1995) was an American football player.

Born in Florence, Alabama, Jones attended Coffee High School and played college football for Union (TN) and Alabama. He played professional football in the National Football League (NFL) as an end and defensive end for the Detroit Lions in 1946 and Baltimore Colts in 1947. He appeared in 17 NFL games, one as a starter

References

1922 births
1995 deaths
American football ends
Alabama Crimson Tide football players
Detroit Lions players
Baltimore Colts players
Players of American football from Alabama
Baltimore Colts (1947–1950) players